Geneviève Amyot (January 10, 1945 – June 11, 2000) was a Canadian poet and novelist.

Amyot was born in Saint-Augustin-de-Desmaures, Quebec. She studied pedagogy at the École Normale Notre-Dame-De-Foy from 1961 to 1965, and then French at Laval University, where she received her degree in 1969. She taught in a primary school from 1965 to 1972, and taught literature at the college level.

She then focused on her writing. She collaborated with many magazines including Estuaire, Dérives, La Nouvelle Barre du jour, Interventions, Québec français and Room of One's Own.

She is the aunt of comedian Yves Amyot.

Collected works
1975 – La mort était extravagante
1976 – L'absent aigu
1978 – Journal de l'année passée
1982 – Dans la pitié des chairs
1988 – Poètes du Québec
1988 – Petites fins du monde
1990 – Corps d'atelier
1994 – Je t'écrirai encore demain
2000 – Corneille et compagnie

Honors
1990 – Terrasses Saint-Sulpice Poetry Award from the Estuaire magazine for Corps d'atelier
1990 – Finalist for the Governor General's Award for French language poetry for Corps d'atelier

Notes and references 

1945 births
Writers from Quebec
2000 deaths
Canadian women poets
People from Capitale-Nationale
Université Laval alumni
20th-century Canadian women writers
Canadian women novelists
20th-century Canadian poets
20th-century Canadian novelists
Canadian poets in French
Canadian novelists in French